Shahrak-e Gharb or Gharb Town ("West Town"), also known as Qods Town ("Quds (Jerusalem) Town"), is a planned town built as a massive project of modern, luxury apartment buildings and villas in the north-western part of Tehran, Iran.

Originally built based on the model of upscale American suburbs in 1961, today it is considered one of the most affluent neighborhoods of Tehran. It is one of the largest districts of Tehran, including easy access to expressways including Chamran Expressway, Hemmat Expressway, Niayesh Expressway, Sheikh Fazl-allah Nouri Expressway, and Yadegar-e-Emam Expressway, proximity to four major hospitals, as well as three large and famous shopping centers, numerous parks, cinema and cultural centers, police and fire stations, and post offices.

Around the 1980s, there was only one central shopping center there, named Bāzārče ("mini-bazaar"). Construction of the Golestan Shopping Center began a few years after the Iran–Iraq War. It was designed by Jordan Gruzen Architects in 1978 and built by another American company by the name Starrett, although some sections were never completed. Today, several modern shopping centers including Golestan, Iran Zamin, and Milad-e-Noor are located in this area.

The tallest tower of Iran, Milad Tower, which stands 435m high from base to tip of the antenna, is located just outside the district.

An international school is located nearby, within the town, and a second is minutes away in Sa'adat Abad. Because of the eastward current of the air in Tehran and its constant purification by the adjacent mountains, this town is less polluted compared to other northern parts of the city. These and many more advantages have made this area a prime and pleasant location for living, attracting many foreign temporary residents, diplomats and expatriates.

Education
The girls' school of Tehran International School is in this community. An elementary school, a middle school, and a high school all by the name of Fajr-e Danesh (but under separate management) also offered non-public schooling to boys in three separate locations in proximity of one another. Sometime between 2010 and 2016, the Fajr-e Danesh schools offering elementary and high school education moved to different locations close by.

Gallery

References

External links
 Shahrak Gharb information website

Neighbourhoods in District 2, Tehran